The 1979–80 Marquette Warriors men's basketball team represented the Marquette University in the 1979–80 season. The Warriors finished the regular season with a record of 17–8. The Warriors would receive an at-large bid into the NCAA Tournament where they would fall in the first round to Villanova.

Roster

Schedule

Team players drafted into the NBA

References 

Marquette
Marquette Golden Eagles men's basketball seasons
Marquette
Marquette
Marquette